Mylnikov (feminine: Mylnikova) is a Russian language occupational surname derived from the occupation of mylnik, soap manufacturer/vendor. The surname may refer to:

Andrei Mylnikov, Russian painter
Grigory Mylnikov, Soviet World War II pilot
Nikolay Mylnikov
Nikolay Mylnikov (painter)
Nikolai Vladimirovich Mylnikov, Russian footballer
Roman Mylnikov, Russian ice dancer
Sergei Mylnikov, ice hockey player

Russian-language surnames